The 2021 Russian Cup was held in Novosibirsk, Russia between 6 and 12 June 2021.

Medalists

Olympic team selection 
After the conclusion of the competition the teams and individuals were selected to represent Russian Olympic Committee athletes at the 2020 Summer Olympics.  For the men Nikita Nagornyy, David Belyavskiy, Aleksandr Kartsev, and Artur Dalaloyan were named to the four person team with Vladislav Poliashov and Denis Ablyazin selected to compete as individuals.  For the women Angelina Melnikova, Viktoria Listunova, and Vladislava Urazova were named to the four person team with the fourth spot going to either Elena Gerasimova or Lilia Akhaimova.  The athlete not chosen for the team will go as an individual along with Anastasia Ilyankova.  Prior to the Olympics Ablyazin was put on the men's team and Kartsev competed as an individual and Akhaimova was selected to compete on the team while Gerasimova competed as an individual.

References

External links
  Official site

Artistic Gymnastics Championships
Russian Artistic Gymnastics Championships
June 2021 sports events in Russia